Jens Jensen Nygård (7 August 1934 – 3 September 2005) was a Norwegian sports shooter. He placed 69th in the 50 metre rifle, prone event at the 1972 Summer Olympics.

References

External links
 

1934 births
2005 deaths
Norwegian male sport shooters
Olympic shooters of Norway
Shooters at the 1972 Summer Olympics
People from Sør-Trøndelag
Sportspeople from Trøndelag
20th-century Norwegian people